This is a list of people who have been president of the Puerto Rico Popular Democratic Party.

References

Popular Democratic Party (Puerto Rico)